Polychronis Vezyridis (born 30 November 1974) is a retired Greek professional football goalkeeper who last played for Superleague side OFI Crete. He was born in Solingen.

References

External links
Insports profile 

1974 births
Living people
Doxa Drama F.C. players
Ethnikos Piraeus F.C. players
German people of Greek descent
Sportspeople of Greek descent
Citizens of Greece through descent
Athinaikos F.C. players
A.O. Kerkyra players
Panserraikos F.C. players
Olympiacos Volos F.C. players
OFI Crete F.C. players
Super League Greece players
Greek footballers
Association football goalkeepers
People from Solingen
Sportspeople from Düsseldorf (region)